Cathedral High School is a private, Roman Catholic high school in New Ulm, Minnesota, United States.  It is located in the Roman Catholic Diocese of New Ulm.

History

Cathedral High School is part of New Ulm Area Catholic Schools and traces its roots back to 1872, and opened in 1919 after the local parochial school added a secondary school class. A new school building was constructed in 1920.

Throughout its history, the school has undergone three name changes; Catholic High School of New Ulm in 1919,  Holy Trinity High School in 1937, and renamed Cathedral High School in 1963.

In the 1960s, the school had about 400 students. The school worked with the local school district to have students take some courses in the New Ulm public school system.

Athletics
The school baseball team is known for winning the 1951 Catholic state championship.

References

External links

Schools in Brown County, Minnesota
New Ulm, Minnesota
Catholic secondary schools in Minnesota
Roman Catholic Diocese of New Ulm
Educational institutions established in 1919
1919 establishments in Minnesota